Oktawian Skrzecz (born 30 May 1997) is a Polish professional footballer who plays as a right winger for Bałtyk Gdynia.

Career

Korona Kielce
Skrzecz joined Korona Kielce in the summer 2018. On 2 September 2019 it was confirmed that he had been loaned out to Stomil Olsztyn for the 2019–20 season.

Stal Rzeszów
On 23 October 2020, he joined Stal Rzeszów.

References

External links

1997 births
Sportspeople from Gdańsk
Living people
Polish footballers
Poland youth international footballers
Association football midfielders
FC Schalke 04 II players
Śląsk Wrocław players
GKS Katowice players
Korona Kielce players
OKS Stomil Olsztyn players
Stal Rzeszów players
Bałtyk Gdynia players
Regionalliga players
Ekstraklasa players
I liga players
II liga players
III liga players
Polish expatriate footballers
Polish expatriate sportspeople in Germany
Expatriate footballers in Germany